The 1970 All-Ireland Intermediate Hurling Championship was the tenth staging of the All-Ireland hurling championship. The championship ended on 4 October 1970.

Kildare were the defending champions, however, they availed of the right to promotion and contested the All-Ireland Senior Hurling Championship. Antrim won the title after defeating Warwickshire by 4-18 to 3-6 in the final.

Results

Munster Intermediate Hurling Championship

Quarter-finals

Semi-finals

Final

All-Ireland Intermediate Hurling Championship

Qualifying play-off

Semi-finals

Final

References

Intermediate
All-Ireland Intermediate Hurling Championship